Reino Henrik Oittinen (26 July 1912, Helsinki – 1 March 1978) was a Finnish politician from the Social Democratic Party.

In the 1930s, Oittinen participated in the municipal politics in Tampere. He was chosen as Finnish Minister of Education on four occasions: 1948–1950, 1951–1953, 1957–1958 and 1966–1968. Oittinen was also Deputy Prime Minister in three cabinets, those of 1957–1958, 1963–1964 and 1966–1968. He also served as the director general of National Board of General Education from 1950 to 1972.

Oittinen received the honorary title of Minister in 1971.

References

External links 

1912 births
1978 deaths
Politicians from Helsinki
People from Uusimaa Province (Grand Duchy of Finland)
Social Democratic Party of Finland politicians
Deputy Prime Ministers of Finland
Ministers of Education of Finland